The women's freestyle 48 kilograms is a competition featured at the 2015 World Wrestling Championships, and was held in Las Vegas, United States on 9 September 2015.

With a bronze medal, Jessica Blaszka became the first wrestler to win a medal for the Netherlands at the World Wrestling Championships after 28 years.

Results
Legend
F — Won by fall

Finals

Top half

Section 1

Section 2

Bottom half

Section 3

Section 4

Repechage

References

External links
Official website

Women's freestyle 48 kg
World